Diema Family is a Bulgarian television channel, part of Nova Broadcasting Group, owned by United Group.

History 
The television was established on 1 August 1999 under the name Alexandra TV as a film channel. On 3 July 2006 the channel was sold to Diema Vision and was rebranded to Diema Family, retooling its program towards families. In 2007, it became a part of Apace Media, and from 2011 it was a part of MTG's Nova TV Group, changing its logo and packaging again and retooling its schedule once more, this time it airs mainly Turkish series and Latin American telenovelas, alongside reruns of some programs from the Nova TV channel. In March 2010 it began broadcasting Big Brother Family live in a house, being scheduled on weekdays from 9:30 to 12:00 and on Saturday and Sunday until 12:15. On 1 April 2011 on the children's block it broadcast the cartoons "Balls" and "New Adventures of Batman"; as of 4 April it was suspended for an indefinite period. New graphics package and a new logo were introduced on 8 April 2019.

Logos history

References

Television networks in Bulgaria
Bulgarian-language television stations
Modern Times Group
Television channels and stations established in 1999
1999 establishments in Bulgaria